

Transfers

Transfers In

Loans In

Transfers Out

Loans Out

League table

Fixtures and results

Pre-season Matches

Friendlies

Lincolnshire Cup

Football League Two

FA Cup

League Cup

Football League Trophy

Squad overview

Appearances and goals

|}

References

Grimsby Town F.C. seasons
Grimsby Town